Eva Gunilla Yvonne Florby (née Niwén; 1943 in Lund, Skåne County – 2011), was a Swedish academic. She grew up in Malmö and received her Ph.D. at Lund University in 1982. She was an English literature professor, first in Lund and from 2002 until her retirement in 2010 at Gothenburg University. She is noted for her studies of the works of the Jacobean poet and playwright George Chapman.

Bibliography 
 The Painful Passage to Virtue: A Study of George Chapman's The Tragedy of Bussy D'Ambois and The Revenge of Bussy D'Ambois, 1982.
 Grammatiskt ABC, 1994.
 The Margin Speaks: A Study of Margaret Laurence & Robert Kroetsch From a Post-colonial Point of View, 1997
 Echoing Texts: George Chapman's Conspiracy and Tragedy of Charles Duke of Byron, 2004.

References 

1943 births
2011 deaths
People from Lund
Lund University alumni
Academic staff of the University of Gothenburg
Swedish women academics